The Islamic Republic of Iran News Network (IRINN) is an Iranian news channel, part of Islamic Republic of Iran Broadcasting corporation, headquartered in the Jame Jam Park in Tehran, Iran. The main programs are political, but sports, science and medical news programs also exist. Its language is mainly in Persian but there are special programs in English and Arabic.

Notable publications

June 22, 2021 
One June 22, 2021, the US department of justice seized 33 Iranian websites they claimed were "spreading disinformation". A statement by IRINN said, the move appeared to be part of a larger-scale crackdown by the U.S. on news websites linked to the “Axis of Resistance”.

October 10, 2022 
During the 2022 Iran Protests, a Hacktivist group called "Edalaat-e-Ali" hacked the News Network, targeting Ayatollah Ali Khamenei and showing 4 women who were victims of allegedly not covering their hair, especially Mahsa Amini, who were featured in the hacked footage scene during the news bulletin.

References

External links

IRIB News Network Live streaming

Television stations in Iran
Mass media in Tehran
Persian-language television stations
Islamic Republic of Iran Broadcasting
24-hour television news channels in Iran
Television channels and stations established in 1999
1999 establishments in Iran
Legislature broadcasters